Jesper Fritz (born 1985 in Malmö, Sweden) is a Swedish pole vaulter. He won the silver medal in the European Under 23 championships. His personal record is 5.70 metres. He was out in the qualifying in Beijing Olympic Games 2008.

References 

Swedish male pole vaulters
Olympic athletes of Sweden
Athletes (track and field) at the 2008 Summer Olympics
1985 births
Living people
Sportspeople from Malmö
21st-century Swedish people